William Paul Gottlieb (January 28, 1917 – April 23, 2006) was an American photographer and newspaper columnist who is best known for his classic photographs of the leading performers of the Golden Age of American jazz in the 1930s and 1940s. Gottlieb's photographs are among the best known and widely reproduced images of this era of jazz.

Gottlieb made portraits of hundreds of prominent jazz musicians and personalities, typically while they were playing or singing at well-known New York City jazz clubs. Gottlieb's subjects included Louis Armstrong, Duke Ellington, Charlie Parker, Billie Holiday, Dizzy Gillespie, Earl Hines, Jo Stafford, Thelonious Monk, Stan Kenton, Ray McKinley, Benny Goodman, Coleman Hawkins, Louis Jordan, Ella Fitzgerald, Toots Thielemans, and Benny Carter. In accord with his wishes, Gottlieb's photographs were placed in the public domain; many are used in Wikipedia and other public domain or freely licensed venues.

Biography

Gottlieb was born on January 28, 1917, in the Canarsie neighborhood of Brooklyn, and grew up in Bound Brook, New Jersey, where his father was in the building and lumber business. He graduated from Lehigh University in 1938 with a degree in economics. While at Lehigh, Gottlieb wrote for the weekly campus newspaper and became editor-in-chief of The Lehigh Review. In his last year of college, he began writing a weekly jazz column for The Washington Post. While writing for the Post, Gottlieb taught economics at the University of Maryland. After the Post determined that it would not pay a photographer to accompany Gottlieb's visits to jazz clubs, Gottlieb borrowed a press camera and began taking pictures for his column.

Gottlieb was drafted into the Army Air Corps in 1943, and  served as a photography and a classifications officer. After World War II, Gottlieb moved to New York City to pursue a career in journalism. He worked as a writer-photographer for Down Beat magazine, and his work also appeared frequently in Record Changer, the Saturday Review, and Collier's. In 1948, Gottlieb retired from jazz journalism in order to spend more time with his wife, Delia, and children.

After Gottlieb left Down Beat, he began working at Curriculum Films, an educational filmstrip company. He founded his own filmstrip company, which was later bought by McGraw Hill. Many of his filmstrips won awards from the Canadian Film Board and the Educational Film Librarians Association. Gottlieb also wrote and illustrated children's books, including several Golden Books such as The Four Seasons, Tigers Adventure, and Laddie the Superdog. He also wrote educational books such as Science Facts You Won't Believe and Space Flight.

Apart from his photography career, Gottlieb also played amateur tennis. Gottlieb and his son Steven were often ranked the number one father-and-son ream  on the East Coast, and were twice ranked among the top ten teams in the US.

Gottlieb married the former Delia Potofsky, daughter of Jacob Potofsky. They had four children, Barbara, Steven, Richard, and Edward. Gottlieb died of complications of a stroke on April 23, 2006, in Great Neck, New York.

References

External links

William P. Gottlieb Collection at the Library of Congress
Jazzphotos.com
Archive.org
LOC gallery William P. Gottlieb
Interviewed William Gottlieb for Jerry Jazz Musician
Bound Brook High School Alumni Association and Hall of Fame

1917 births
2006 deaths
20th-century American photographers
Jazz photographers
Lehigh University alumni
People from Bound Brook, New Jersey